, abbreviated as , is a private research university in Japan. Its predecessor, Nihon Law School (currently the Department of Law), was founded by Yamada Akiyoshi, the Minister of Justice, in 1889. It is one of Japan's leading  private universities. The university's name is derived from the Japanese word "Nihon" meaning Japan. Nihon University now has "16 colleges and 87 departments, 20 postgraduate schools, 1 junior college which is composed of 5 departments, 1 correspondence division, 32 research institutes and 3 hospitals." 
The number of students exceeds 70,000 and is the largest in Japan.

University profile 
Most of the university's campuses are in the Kantō region, with the vast majority in Tokyo or surrounding areas, although two campuses are as far away from Tokyo as Shizuoka Prefecture and Fukushima Prefecture. These campuses mostly accommodate single colleges or schools ( in Japanese).

The university comprises a federation of colleges and institutes known for having produced numerous Japanese CEOs. Its College of Art (日芸 — Nichigei), located right next to Ekoda train station in Tokyo's Nerima ward, is well-known for producing many artists who represent Japan in photography, theater, and cinema. In addition, the university has over 20 affiliated high schools bearing its name across Japan, from which a significant number of students go on to study at the institution as undergraduates.

Faculties and graduate schools

Colleges and departments 
 College of Law (1889-; Chiyoda, Tokyo & Saitama, Saitama)
 Law / Political Science and Economics / Journalism / Management Law / Public Administration
 College of Humanities and Sciences (1901-; Setagaya, Tokyo)
 Philosophy / History / Japanese Language and Literature / Chinese Language and Culture / English Literature / German Literature
 Sociology / Education / Physical Education / Psychology
 Geography / Geosystem Sciences / Mathematics / Computer Science and System Analysis / Physics / Integrated Science in Physics and Biology / Chemistry
 College of Economics (1904-; Chiyoda, Tokyo)
 Economics (1st division / 2nd division / international course)  / Industrial Management / Finance and Public Economics
 College of Commerce (1904-; Setagaya, Tokyo)
 Commerce / Business Administration / Accounting

 College of Art (1921-; Nerima, Tokyo & Tokorozawa, Saitama)
 Photography / Cinema / Fine Arts / Music / Literary Arts / Drama / Broadcasting / Design
 College of International Relations (1978-; Mishima, Shizuoka)
 International Relations / Intercultural Relations / Global Exchange Studies / International Business and Information
 College of Science and Technology (1920-; Chiyoda, Tokyo & Funabashi, Chiba)
 Civil Engineering / Transportation Engineering and Socio-Technology / Architecture / Oceanic Architecture and Engineering / Mechanical Engineering / Precision Machinery Engineering / Aerospace Engineering / Electrical Engineering / Electronics and Computer Science / Materials and Applied Chemistry / Physics / Mathematics
 College of Industrial Technology (1952-; Narashino, Chiba)
 Mechanical Engineering / Electrical and Electronic Engineering / Civil Engineering / Architecture and Architectural Engineering / Applied Molecular Chemistry / Industrial Engineering and Management / Mathematical Information Engineering / Liberal Arts and Basic Science
 College of Engineering (1947-; Koriyama, Fukushima)
 Civil Engineering / Architecture / Mechanical Engineering / Electrical and Electronics Engineering / Materials Chemistry and Engineering / Computer Science
 School of Medicine (1925-; Itabashi, Tokyo)
 Medicine
 School of Dentistry (1921-; Chiyoda, Tokyo)
 Dentistry
 School of Dentistry at Matsudo (1971-; Matsudo, Chiba)
 Dentistry
 College of Bioresource Science (1943-; Fujisawa, Kanagawa)
 Plant Science and Resources / Animal Sciences and Resources / Marine Sciences and Resources / Forest Sciences and Resources / Bioenvironmental and Agricultural Resources / Food Science and Technology / Agricultural and Biological Chemistry / Applied Biological Sciences / Food Economics / International Development Studies / Veterinary Medicine
 College of Pharmacy (1952-; Narashino, Chiba)
 Pharmacy / Biological Pharmacy
 Correspondence Division (1948-; Chiyoda, Tokyo)

Graduate schools 
 Advanced Research Institute for the Sciences and Humanities
 Graduate School of Law
 Graduate School of Liberal Arts
 Graduate School of Science and Technology
 Graduate School of Integrated Basic Sciences
 Graduate School of Economics
 Graduate School of Commerce
 Graduate School of Art
 Graduate School of International Relations
 Graduate School of Industrial Technology
 Graduate School of Engineering
 Graduate School of Medicine
 Graduate School of Dentistry
 Graduate School of Dentistry at Matsudo
 Graduate School of Bioresource Science
 Graduate School of Pharmacy
 Graduate School of Business
 Graduate School of Social and Cultural Studies
 Law School

Teaching staff 
See

Alumni 

* Did not graduate.
 Abe Shuji, President and CEO of Yoshinoya
 Akio Mori, physiologist and writer
 Akira Gomi, photographer
 Banana Yoshimoto, writer
 C. W. Nicol, environmentalist
 Daishōmaru Shōgo, sumo wrestler
 Daisuke Ono, voice actor
 Takehiko Orimo, basketball player
 Dong Biwu, Chinese communist revolutionary, Acting President of the People's Republic of China (1972–1975)
 Endō Shōta, sumo wrestler
 Hamanoshima Keishi, sumo wrestler
 Hidenoumi Takuya, sumo wrestler
 Higonoumi Naoya, sumo wrestler
 Hiroko Mima, Miss Japan Universe and 15th runner-up for Miss Universe
 Hiroshi Suga, photographer
 Hiroshi Watanabe, photographer
 Hiroshi Yamazaki, photographer
 Ian Buruma, writer
 Ichiro Ozawa, statesman*
 Ishiura Masakatsu, sumo wrestler
 Jōkōryū Takayuki, sumo wrestler
 Jun Konno, judo wrestler
 Junya Koizumi, statesman
 Kōtarō Iizawa, photographic critic
 Ken Domon, photographer*
 Kishin Shinoyama, photographer
 Koichi Hamada, statesman
 Kotomitsuki Keiji, sumo wrestler
 Kyuichi Tokuda, lawyer, politician, leader of the Japanese Communist Party (1945–1950)
 Mainoumi Shūhei, sumo wrestler
 Makoto Hasegawa, basketball player
 Makoto Koga, statesman
 Makoto Takimoto, judo wrestler
 Masato Matsuura, CEO of Avex Group
 Maximo Blanco, wrestler; professional Mixed Martial Artist in the UFC's Featherweight Division
 Megumi Han, Voice actress and singer
 Miyako Matsumoto, actress and professional wrestler
 Satoyama Kōsaku, sumo wrestler
 Shoji Meguro, video game music composer
 Sido Nakamura, actor*
 Takamisakari Seiken, sumo wrestler
 Takashi Sasano, actor*
 Tetsuya Ichimura, photographer*
 Tomoyuki Furumaya, film director
 Toru Yano, professional wrestler
 Toshiaki Kasuga, comedian
 Tsutomu Sato, statesman
 Wajima Hiroshi, sumo wrestler, the 54th yokozuna
 Yasuaki Kurata, actor and martial artist
 Yasuhiro Sonoda, statesman
 Yoshikazu Tanaka, CEO and Founder of GREE Inc.
 Yoshino Ōishi, photojournalist
 Yoshinobu Nishizaki, animator
 Yoshisada Yonezuka, 9th Dan (Kudan) Judo Instructor
 Yoshiyuki Tomino, animator
 Yutaka Takanashi, photographer
Yutaka Yaguchi, 9th Dan Shotokan Karate Master
 Kei Tomiyama, voice actor*
 Kentaro Miura, mangaka

Scandals

American football dirty tackle 
In May 2018, at an American football game between the Nihon University team and the Kwansei Gakuin University team, a Nihon University team member violently tackled an opposing team member from behind after play was over. The tackled Kwansei Gakuin team member received an injury in his back ligaments as a result, and had to take a month out from football to recover. A third-party committee convened by Nihon University to investigate the incident found that the Nihon University team's coach and assistant coach had instructed a team member to dirty-tackle that particular player on the Kwansei Gakuin team. Furthermore, another independent investigation, by the Kantoh Collegiate American Football Association, reached the same conclusion, and expelled the coaches from the Association. Nihon University reached an out-of-court settlement with the injured Kwansei Gakuin team player. A decision by Tokyo's Metropolitan Police Department not to prosecute the coaches was harshly criticized by those who had carried out the above investigations.

Alleged tax evasion by Chairman of the Board 
On November 29, 2021, the former chairman of the board of Nihon University, Hidetoshi Tanaka, was arrested for alleged tax evasion, and indicted by prosecutors on December 20. Tanaka had allegedly received approximately 118 million yen in bribes from 2018 to 2020 paid by contractors in return for contracts being awarded for work at Nihon University. He had allegedly failed to declare the money as income, thus allegedly evading payment of approximately 52 million yen in tax.  Tanaka announced his resignation on December 1, 2021. By accepting his resignation rather than dismissing him, the board ensured that Tanaka would remain eligible for a retirement bonus of hundreds of millions of yen.

See also 

 Casals Hall, a chamber music venue owned by Nihon University

References

External links 

  (English portal)
  

 
Private universities and colleges in Japan
Educational institutions established in 1889
Universities and colleges in Tokyo
1889 establishments in Japan
American football in Japan
Kantoh Collegiate American Football Association Top 8 university